The Urdu Bazaar is a major market in the walled city of Delhi, India.

Urdu Bazaar may also refer to:

 Urdu Bazaar (Karachi), Pakistan
 Urdu Bazaar (Sargodha), Pakistan